The  is the Japanese system of promoting an employee in order of his or her proximity to retirement. The advantage of the system is that it allows older employees to achieve a higher salary level before retirement and that it usually brings more experience to the executive ranks. The disadvantage of the system is that it does not allow new talent to be merged with the experience and those with specialized skills cannot be promoted to the already crowded executive ranks. It also does not guarantee or even attempt to bring the "right person for the right job".  The labor turnover rate in Japan is less than half the US level.  The seniority-wage system can also be seen in Japanese government. Japanese parliament seats are usually filled with the older members from each party.

After the economic bubble burst in Japan in the late 1980s and the venture capital (dot-com) shock of the 1990s, the seniority-wage system has become less popular amongst business as they could not afford to keep older employees with high salaries on the payroll. Many mid-level executives that climbed the corporate ladder with the Nenko system fell victim to corporate restructuring.

See also
 Seniority
 Simultaneous Recruiting of New Graduates

External links
LABOR TURNOVER IN THE USA AND JAPAN: A TALE OF TWO COUNTRIES

References

Human resource management
Japanese business terms